Gonzalo Julián Melero Manzanares (born 2 January 1994) is a Spanish professional footballer who plays for UD Almería as a central midfielder.

Club career
Born in Madrid, Melero joined Real Madrid's youth setup in 2004, aged ten, after starting out at EF Zona Norte. He made his debut as a senior with the former's C-team in the 2013–14 campaign, being relegated from Segunda División B.

In July 2014 Melero was promoted to the reserves, now also in the third level. On 30 January of the following year, after being sparingly used by manager Zinedine Zidane, he moved to Segunda División's SD Ponferradina in a -year deal.

Melero made his professional debut on 15 February 2015, coming on as a second half substitute for Pablo Infante in a 2–1 home loss against CD Numancia. He scored his first professional goal on 27 February of the following year, but in a 4–2 away loss against Bilbao Athletic.

On 27 July 2016, after Ponfe's relegation, Melero signed a one-year contract with SD Huesca still in the second level. On 10 December, he scored a brace in a 5–2 home routing of UCAM Murcia CF.

Melero was an undisputed starter during the 2017–18 campaign, contributing with a career-best 17 goals as his side achieved promotion to La Liga. He made his debut in the category on 19 August 2018, playing the full 90 minutes in a 2–1 away win against SD Eibar.

On 3 July 2019, after suffering relegation, Melero signed a four-year contract with Levante UD still in the top tier. 

On 1 September 2022, he agreed to a four-year deal with UD Almería also in the first division.

References

External links
Real Madrid profile

1994 births
Living people
Footballers from Madrid
Spanish footballers
Association football midfielders
La Liga players
Segunda División players
Segunda División B players
Real Madrid C footballers
Real Madrid Castilla footballers
SD Ponferradina players
SD Huesca footballers
Levante UD footballers
UD Almería players
Spain youth international footballers